José Alberto Sochón (born 27 August 1980) is a Guatemalan cyclist. He competed in the men's keirin at the 2004 Summer Olympics.

References

External links
 

1980 births
Living people
Guatemalan male cyclists
Olympic cyclists of Guatemala
Cyclists at the 2004 Summer Olympics
Place of birth missing (living people)
Pan American Games medalists in cycling
Competitors at the 2006 Central American and Caribbean Games
Competitors at the 2010 Central American and Caribbean Games
Pan American Games bronze medalists for Guatemala
Medalists at the 2003 Pan American Games
Cyclists at the 2003 Pan American Games